Shah Alam is a Bangladesh Awami League politician and the former Member of Parliament of Pirojpur-2.

Career
Alam was elected to parliament from Pirojpur-2 as a Bangladesh Awami League candidate in 2008.

References

Awami League politicians
Living people
1951 births
9th Jatiya Sangsad members